Billy Lau Nam Kwong (born 3 April 1954) is a Hong Kong film actor, director and writer. He is best known for playing the Police Captain in Mr. Vampire (1985) and went on to be cast in similar roles. He has appeared in many comedy and horror films.

Personal life
Before acting Lau was an optician for some time and treated Bey Logans' wife's.

After the closure of Digital Broadcasting Corporation on 10 October 2012. Lau, activists and radio hosts began a three-day sit-in protest in front of the government headquarters due to freedom of speech concerns. Lau went on hunger strike more than 130 hours and eventual went to hospital. An Internet radio station D100 was established due to the closure of Digital Broadcast Corporation.

Filmography

TV Series

Film

TV ads
 1984–1986: Ocean Park Hong Kong

Nomination 
 Lau was nominated at Hong Kong film for best supporting actor and best newcomer but lost to Maggie Cheung – Behind the Yellow Line

References

External links

 Billy Lau at Hong Kong Movie Database

1954 births
Living people
20th-century Hong Kong male actors
21st-century Hong Kong male actors
Hong Kong male film actors
Hong Kong film directors
Hong Kong film presenters
Hong Kong film producers
Hong Kong screenwriters